This is a list of notable alumni, faculty, and students of Southern Methodist University. Those individuals who qualify for multiple categories have been placed under the section for which they are best known.

Notable alumni and attendees

Politics and government

Foreign government
 Fadel Mohammed Ali (M.S. 1978) – Jordanian former director of the Royal Maintenance Corps of the Jordanian Armed Forces
 Ahmed Mohamed Zakaria (B.S. 2003) – Former Treasurer of the Government of Dubai - Department of Finance.
 Fahad Almubarak (B.S.) – Governor Central Bank of the Kingdom of Saudi Arabia
 Catherine Bamugemereire (LL.M. 2003) – justice of the Constitutional Court and Court of Appeal of Uganda, the second-highest judicial organ in Uganda
 Gela Bezhuashvili (LL.M. 1997) – Georgian former head of the Georgian Intelligence Service, Minister of Defense, Minister of Foreign Affairs
 Charles Brumskine (LL.M. 1982) – Liberian leader of the Liberty Party, former President pro tempore of the Liberian Senate
 Hideo Chikusa (M.C.L. '62) – justice of the Supreme Court of Japan
 Haechang Chung (M.C.L. '68) – former minister of justice and former chief of staff to the president of Korea
 Mirsad Hadžikadić (PhD 1987) – professor and director of the Institute of Complex Systems at the University of North Carolina at Charlotte and candidate for presidency of Bosnia and Herzegovina in the 2018 election
 Yukio Horigome – justice, Supreme Court of Japan
 Joseph Fitzgerald Kamara (LL.M. 2000) – Attorney General and Minister of Justice, Sierra Leone 
 Susan Kihika - Senator for Nakuru County, Republic of Kenya
 S. M. Krishna (LL.M. 1959) – Indian former Minister of External Affairs, Governor of Maharashtra, Chief Minister of Karnataka
 Bagir Manan – Chief Justice of the Supreme Court of Indonesia
 Shigeharu Negishi (M.C.L. '60) – justice, Supreme Court of Japan
 Reynato Puno (LL.M. 1967) – 22nd Chief Justice of the Supreme Court of the Philippines (2007–2010), 131st Associate Justice of the Supreme Court of the Philippines (1993–2007)
 Manouchehr Talieh – justice Supreme Court of Iran
 Gillian Triggs (LL.M. '72) – president of the Australian Human Rights Commission

U.S. government

U.S. Cabinet/White House

 Laura Bush (B.S. 1968) – First Lady of the United States (2001–2009), First Lady of Texas (1995–2000)
 Bill Clements (attended) – U.S. Deputy Secretary of Defense (1973–1977)
 Hope Hicks (B.A. 2010) – former White House Communications Director, former press secretary for Donald Trump's 2016 presidential campaign and presidential transition team
 Karen Hughes (B.A. 1977) – former Under Secretary for Public Diplomacy and Public Affairs, Counselor to the President, White House Communications Director
 Jo Jorgensen (MBA 1980) - Libertarian Party's nominee in the 2020 election, First woman to become the Libertarian nominee and the only female 2020 presidential candidate with ballot access to over 270 electoral votes.
 John Lee Ratcliffe (J.D. 1989) - former Director of National Intelligence, former member of the U.S. House of Representatives from Texas representing the 4th district. 
 Chad Wolf (B.A. 1998) –  Acting Secretary United States Department of Homeland Security and Under Secretary of Homeland Security for Strategy, Policy, and Plans, previously, Chief of Staff of the United States Department of Homeland Security and Chief of Staff of the Transportation Security Administration

U.S. Senate

 Bob Krueger (B.A. 1957) – former U.S. Senator and member of the U.S. House of Representatives from Texas, U.S. Ambassador to Botswana, U.S. Ambassador to Burundi
 Rick Scott (J.D. 1978) – U.S. Senator from Florida
 John Tower (M.A. 1951) – former U.S. Senator from Texas

U.S. House of Representatives
 John Wiley Bryant (B.A. 1969, J.D. 1972) – former member of the U.S. House of Representatives from Texas
 Jim Chapman (J.D. 1970) – former member of the U.S. House of Representatives from Texas
 James M. Collins (B.S. 1937) – former member of the U.S. House of Representatives from Texas
 John Culberson (B.A. 1981) – former member of the U.S. House of Representatives from Texas
 Bob Franks (J.D. 1976) – former member of the U.S. House of Representatives from New Jersey, chairman of the New Jersey Republican State Committee
 Ralph Hall (LL.B. 1951) – former member of the U.S. House of Representatives from Texas
 Eddie Bernice Johnson (M.P.A. 1976) – current member of the U.S. House of Representatives from Texas
 Sam Johnson (B.B.A. 1951) – former member of the U.S. House of Representatives from Texas
 Bob Krueger (B.A. 1957) – former member of the U.S. House of Representatives from Texas, U.S. Ambassador to Botswana, U.S. Ambassador to Burundi
 Dennis Moore (attended) – former member of the U.S. House of Representatives from Kansas
 John Lee Ratcliffe (J.D. 1989) - former member of the U.S. House of Representatives from Texas representing the 4th district, 2015 - 2020.
 Lamar Smith (J.D. 1975) – former member of the U.S. House of Representatives from Texas

U.S. ambassadors and diplomats
 Rena Bitter (J.D. 1991) – former U.S. Ambassador to Laos, Nominee for Assistant Secretary of State for Consular Affairs
 Teel Bivins (J.D. 1976) – former U.S. Ambassador to Sweden, member of the Texas Senate
 Tony Garza (J.D. 1983) – former U.S. Ambassador to Mexico, Texas Railroad Commissioner, 98th Secretary of State of Texas
 Roy M. Huffington (B.S. 1938) – former U.S. Ambassador to Austria
 Bob Krueger (B.A. 1957) – former U.S. Ambassador to Botswana, U.S. Ambassador to Burundi
 George C. McGhee (attended) – former U.S. Ambassador to Turkey, U.S. Ambassador to West Germany, Under Secretary of State for Political Affairs
 Jeanne L. Phillips (B.A. 1976) – former U.S. Ambassador to the Organisation for Economic Co-operation and Development
 Elizabeth Holzhall Richard (B.A. 1981, J.D. 1984) – current U.S. Ambassador to Lebanon
 Roy R. Rubottom Jr. (B.A. 1933) – former U.S. Ambassador to Argentina, Assistant secretary for Inter-American Affairs

State governors

 Bill Clements (attended) – 42nd and 44th governor of Texas (1979–1983; 1987–1991), U.S. Deputy Secretary of Defense (1973–1977)
 Rick Scott (J.D. 1978) – 45th governor of Florida (2011–2019)

State legislators
 Rafael Anchia (B.A. 1990) – current member of the Texas House of Representatives
 Leo Berman (B.A. 1969) – former member of the Texas House of Representatives, member of the city council of Arlington, Texas
 Dan Branch (J.D.) – former member of the Texas House of Representatives
 Raleigh Brown – member of the Texas House of Representatives; Texas State District Court judge in Abilene
 Jim R. Caldwell (M.S.) – former member of the Arkansas Senate, chairman of the Arkansas Republican Party
 Mickey Dollens (B.A. 2011) – current member of the Oklahoma House of Representatives
 Charlie Geren (B.B.A. 1971) – member of the Texas House of Representatives from his native Fort Worth
 Ike Harris (J.D. 1960) – member of the Texas Senate (1967–1995), President pro tempore of the Texas Senate (1973)
 Todd Ames Hunter (Law '78) – member of the Texas House of Representatives from Corpus Christi (Democrat, 1989–1997; Republican, since 2009)
 Ray Hutchison (B.A. '57, J.D. '59) – former state representative and partner in Vinson and Elkins in Dallas; husband of U.S. Senator Kay Bailey Hutchison
 Jim Keet (B.B.A. 1971) – 2010 Republican nominee for Governor of Arkansas, member of the Arkansas Senate (1993–1997), member of the Arkansas House of Representatives (1989–1991)
 Bill Keffer (B.A. 1981) – member of the Texas House of Representatives (2003–2007)
 Sharon Keller – Presiding Judge of the Texas Court of Criminal Appeals
 Bob McFarland (J.D. 1966) – member of the Texas Senate (1983–1991), President pro tempore of the Texas Senate (1989)
 Morgan Meyer – Republican member of the Texas House of Representatives from District 108 in Dallas County, including University Park
 Barrow Peacock – Republican member of the Louisiana State Senate from Shreveport
 E. J. Pipkin (M.S. 2014) – Republican member of the Maryland Senate (2003–2013)
 Ana-Maria Ramos (J.D.) - current member of the Texas House of Representatives
 Matt Shaheen – Republican member of the Texas House of Representatives from Plano, effective 2015; former Collin County commissioner; received master's degree from SMU
 Kenneth Sheets (J.D. 2004) – Dallas attorney and Republican member of the Texas House of Representatives from District 107 in Dallas County since 2011
 Virginia Shehee – member of the Louisiana State Senate from Shreveport, 1976 to 1980; businesswoman and philanthropist; studied social work at SMU
 Burt Solomons – Republican former member of the Texas House of Representatives from Denton County; received a Master of Public Administration degree from SMU in early 1970s

Other state and local government
 Dewey F. Bartlett Jr. (M.B.A. 1971) – 39th mayor of Tulsa, Oklahoma (2009–2016), son of former U.S. Senator Dewey F. Bartlett
 Bryan Bush – district attorney of East Baton Rouge Parish, Louisiana (1985–1990)
 K. Dennise Garcia (B. A., B.S., J.D.) State District Judge (2004-2020); Justice, 5th District Court of  Appeals (2021–present)  https://ballotpedia.org/Dennise_Garcia
 Eric V. Moyé (B.A.) State District Judge (1992–95; 2008–present)
 Barbara Staff (B.A.) – Texas Republican Party activist, Texas co-chairman of Ronald Reagan's 1976 presidential primary campaign
 Martha Whitehead (B.A. 1962) – last Texas State Treasurer (1993–1996)
 Phil Wilson (M.B.A.) – 106th Texas Secretary of State (2007–2008)

Military

 Fred E. Ellis – Air National Guard major general
 Fred E. Haynes Jr. – World War II Marine Officer and later Major General; brother of actor Jerry Haynes
 General Craig R. McKinley (B.B.A. 1974) – 26th Chief of the National Guard Bureau (2008–2012)
 Jack Miller – World War II Marine Officer; namesake of the USS Jack Miller
 Huan Nguyen – first Vietnamese-American Navy rear admiral
 Harry M. Wyatt III (B. A. in Business Administration, 1974) – attorney, retired lieutenant general of the U.S. Air Force, former Adjutant General of Oklahoma, former Secretary of Military Affairs for State of Oklahoma; J. D. from University of Tulsa School of Law (1980)

Business

 Gerald Alley – founder, president and CEO, Con-Real
 Thaddeus Arroyo – CEO, AT&T Business Solutions and International
 Gabriel Barbier-Mueller – founder and CEO, Harwood International
 Harry W. Bass, Jr. – owner, Vail Resorts
 April Beasley – CEO of RCKT, Global Marketing Strategist for tech startups
 Mark Blinn – former president and chief executive officer, Flowserve Corporartion
 Henry L. Brandon – chairman of the board, Unocal Corporation
 John J Christmann IV – chairman and CEO, Apache Corporation
 Richard L. Clemmer (MBA) – CEO of NXP Semiconductors
 Lodwrick Cook – chairman and CEO, Atlantic Richfield Company (ARCO)
 Trammell Crow – Founder, Trammell Crow Company
 Álex Cruz – CEO, British Airways
 C. David Cush – CEO, Virgin America
 Aaron Davidson – chairman of the North American Soccer League and president of Traffic Sports USA
 Aart J. de Geus – co-founder, chairman and CEO of Synopsys
 Robert H. Dedman, Sr. – founder and CEO, ClubCorp
 Robert H. Dedman, Jr. – former CEO, ClubCorp
 David B. Dillon – president and chairman of the Kroger Co.
 Bob Dudley – CEO, BP
 Thomas Dundon (B.S. 1993) – chairman and managing partner of Dundon Capital Partners in Dallas, Texas, owner of the Carolina Hurricanes of the National Hockey League and one-quarter of TopGolf
 J. Lindsay Embrey – chairman and CEO of First Continental Enterprises Inc. and Embrey Enterprises Inc.
 Martin L. Flanagan – president and CEO, Invesco
 Gerald J. Ford (B.A. 1966, J.D. 1969) – Dallas-based billionaire
 Jerry Fullinwider – founder of V–F Petroleum
 Deborah Gibbins – chief operating officer, Mary Kay, Inc.
 Rob C. Holmes – CEO, President and a member of the Board of Directors, Texas Capital Bank
 Donald Holmquest – CEO, California RHIO
 Thomas W. Horton – CEO, American Airlines
 Clark Hunt (B.B.A. 1987) – current part owner, chairman, and CEO of the Kansas City Chiefs (NFL), founding investor-owner in Major League Soccer
 Helen LaKelly Hunt – founder of The Sister Fund
 Hunter L. Hunt (B.A. 1990) – current chairman and CEO of Hunt Consolidated Energy
 Lamar Hunt (B.S. 1956) – principal founder of the American Football League (AFL), Major League Soccer (MLS), and Kansas City Chiefs, owner of the Kansas City Wizards, Columbus Crew, and FC Dallas
 Ray Lee Hunt – chairman and CEO, Hunt Oil Company
 Jim Irsay (B.A. 1982) – current owner and CEO of the Indianapolis Colts of the National Football League
 Keith D. Jackson – president, CEO and Director of ON Semiconductor and 2020 Chair of the Semiconductor Industry Association (SIA) Board of Directors
 Jerry Junkins – president, chairman, and CEO of Texas Instruments (1988–1996)
 Paul B. Loyd, Jr. – former chairman and CEO of the R&B Falcon Corporation, the world's largest offshore drilling company (1997–2001); sits on the SMU Board of Trustees
 Harold MacDowell – CEO, TDIndustries
 John H. Matthews
 Beth E. Mooney – CEO of Key Bank
 Kenneth R. Morris – co-founder, PeopleSoft
 Robert Mosbacher, Jr. – Houston businessman; president of Mosbacher Energy Company, Overseas Private Investment Corporation
 Erle A. Nye – chairman and CEO, TXU
 William J. O'Neil – founder of the business newspaper Investor's Business Daily
 Jamie Patel – Senior Vice-president and Chief Technology Officer, American Century Investments
Marc Patrick (B.A. 1993) – Senior director for global brand communications, Nike, Inc.
 Martin W. "Bud" Pernoll – founder and CEO, Bay Mutual Financial
 Eckhard Pfeiffer (MBA) – chairman and CEO, Compaq
 Melissa Reiff – CEO, The Container Store
 Robert Rowling – U.S. billionaire No. 45 on Forbes 400
 Edward B. Rust, Jr. (MBA) – chairman and CEO, State Farm Insurance
 John Santa María Otazua – CEO, Coca-Cola FEMSA
 George Edward Seay III – businessman; co-founder and CEO of Annandale Capital; philanthropist; conservative political activist
 Mark Shepherd – chairman and CEO, Texas Instruments
 Jeffrey Skilling – chairman and CEO of Enron
 Jeff Storey, president and chief executive officer of Level 3 Communications
 Emily Summers – interior designer
 John H. Tyson – chairman of Tyson Foods
 Ray Washburne – real estate investor 
 Whitney Wolfe Herd – founder and CEO, Bumble; co-founder of Tinder
 Donald Zale – chairman, Capitol Entertainment Group and son of Morris (M. B.) Zale, the co-founder of Zale Corporation

Law

 James A. Baker (B.B.A. 1953, LL.B. 1958) – justice of the Supreme Court of Texas (1995–2002)
 Jeff Cox (Legal Law Masters in Taxation) – judge since 2005 of the Louisiana 26th Judicial District Court of Bossier and Webster parishes
 Craig T. Enoch – justice, Texas Supreme Court
 Mondonna ("Mondi") Ghasedi (BA 1996) - Judge, State of Missouri (21st Circuit - St. Louis County) 
 David C. Godbey – federal judge
 Deborah Hankinson – former justice of Texas Supreme Court
 Nathan Hecht – chief justice, Texas Supreme Court
 Stephen N. Limbaugh, Jr. – justice, Supreme Court of Missouri
 Barbara M.G. Lynn – judge, United States District Court for the Northern District of Texas
 Robert B. Maloney – federal judge
 Lawrence E. Meyers – judge of the Texas Court of Criminal Appeals since 1993; resides in Fort Worth
 Harriet Miers – George W. Bush administration nominee to the United States Supreme Court
James Latane Noel, Jr. – Attorney General of Texas
 Michael Pryles (LL.M '68, S.J.D '70) former Commissioner, Australian Law Reform Commission; former Commissioner, United Nations Compensation Commission (Geneva); chairman, Singapore International Arbitration Centre (2009–2012)
 William Steger – judge, United States District Court for the Eastern District of Texas

Scientists

 Michael Bunnell - Winner of 2010 Scientific and Engineering Academy Award for making computer-generated characters look more real
 Donald D. Clayton – astrophysicist
 James Cronin – Nobel Prize-winning physicist
 Robert Dennard – computing pioneer
 Donald Holmquest – NASA astronaut, physician
 Jack N. James – engineer and manager at the Jet Propulsion Laboratory; project manager for the Mariner program
 Kent Norman – cognitive psychologist and expert on computer rage
 Andrés Ruzo – geothermal scientist and a National Geographic Young Explorer
 Clyde Snow – forensic anthropologist

 Robert Taylor – computing pioneer
 Mary E. Weber – NASA astronaut
 Donald J. Wheeler – expert on statistical process control and data analysis
 Cindy Ann Yeilding - American geologist and former Vice-president of British Petroleum, BP

Academia

 Betsy Boze (née Betsy Vogel) – President, The College of The Bahamas
 Larry Faulkner – President, University of Texas at Austin (1998–2006)
 Utpal K. Goswami - President  Santa Barbara City College (SBCC)
 Lee F. Jackson – former Chancellor of the University of North Texas System (2002–2017) and the State of Texas' longest-serving chancellor at the time when he announced his retirement in March 2017.
 Jo Jorgensen (M.B.A. 1983) – 2020 Libertarian Party Presidential Candidate and Senior Lecturer of Industrial/Organizational Psychology at Clemson University
 Herma Hill Kay – Dean, UC Berkeley School of Law
 Mary Elizabeth Moore - Dean, Boston University School of Theology
 Donde Plowman – Chancellor of the University of Tennessee (2019–present)
 William C. Roberts – cardiologist; pathologist; first head of pathology for the National Heart, Lung and Blood Institute
 Andrea I. Robinson – master sommelier and dean of wine studies at the French Culinary Institute
 Earl Rose – Dallas County medical examiner at the time of the assassination of John F. Kennedy; pathologist at University of Iowa
 Vernon L. Scarborough (PhD 1980) – Mesoamerican archaeologist; professor and head of department in anthropology at University of Cincinnati
 Thomas F. Siems – senior economist and policy advisor in the Research Department at the Federal Reserve Bank of Dallas

Film, performing arts, television, radio, popular culture

 Amy Acker – actress, Person of Interest, Angel
 Michael Aronov – actor, playwright
 Antoine Ashley (a.k.a. Sahara Davenport) – female impersonator, singer, and reality show participant (RuPaul`s Drag Race)
 Astronautalis (Charles Andrew Bothwell) – hip-hop artist
 Bob Banner – TV producer
 Joseph Banowetz – Grammy-nominated classical pianist; music professor
 David Barrera – actor, Generation Kill
 Adam Bartley – actor notable for television's Longmire
 David Bates – artist
 Kathy Bates – Oscar-winning actress
 Brian Baumgartner – actor on The Office
 Matt Earl Beesley – TV and film director
 Andy Blankenbuehler – dancer, choreographer, Hamilton, Bandstand, In the Heights
 Powers Boothe – Emmy Award-winning actor
 Cale Boyter – film producer, Wedding Crashers
 Edie Brickell – singer-songwriter, guitarist with The New Bohemians
 Allen Case – Broadway and television actor (The Deputy)
 R. Jane Chu – chairperson, National Endowment for the Arts
 Laura Claycomb – operatic soprano
 Eddie Coker – children's musician
 Graham Colton – pop singer, performer, songwriter
 Cristi Conaway – actress
 Mimi Davila – from the Chonga Girls
 Paige Davis – TLC Network personality
 Stefanie de Roux – model, represented Panama in Miss Universe 2003 and Miss Earth 2006
 Fernando del Valle (Brian S. Skinner) – operatic tenor
 Hacksaw Jim Duggan – pro wrestler
 Amanda Dunbar – visual artist
 Mary Elizabeth Ellis – actress known for portraying "The Waitress" on It's Always Sunny in Philadelphia
 Bill Fagerbakke – actor on Coach and voice on SpongeBob SquarePants
 Katie Featherston – lead actress in the independent horror film Paranormal Activity
 Morgan Garrett – voice actress affiliated with Funimation
 Clarence Gilyard – actor, Walker, Texas Ranger
 Lynda Goodfriend - American actress
 Lauren Graham – lead actress, Gilmore Girls, Parenthood, and Guys and Dolls on broadway
 Art Greenhaw – Grammy Award-winning artist, record producer and audio engineer
 Daniel Hart – musician and composer
 James V. Hart – screenwriter and author
 Jerry Haynes -  Actor, most well known as Mr. Peppermint, brother of Fred E. Haynes Jr., World War II Marine Officer and later Major General;
 Thomas Hayward – chairman of the Voice and Opera departments of the Meadows School of the Arts; named distinguished professor of voice 1990; namesake of the Thomas Hayward Memorial Award scholarship
 Jerrika Hinton – actress, Grey's Anatomy
 John Holiday – operatic countertenor
 David Hudgins – TV writer and producer, Everwood and Friday Night Lights
 Tom Hussey – photographer specializing in commercial advertising and lifestyle photography
 Jack Ingram – country music singer
 Rick Jaffa – screenwriter
 William Joyce – creator of Rolie Polie Olie and George Shrinks, Academy Award winner
 Ron Judkins – production sound mixer and writer-director
 Kourtney Kardashian (attended) – co-owner of D-A-S-H; featured on Keeping Up with the Kardashians, Kourtney and Khloé Take Miami, and Kourtney and Kim Take New York
 Bavand Karim – TV and film producer
 Jordan Ladd – actress and model
 Sheryl Leach – creator of Barney & Friends children's television program
 Gus Levene – arranger, composer, orchestrator, and guitarist
 Lydia Mackay – voice actress affiliated with Funimation
 Dorothy Malone – Academy Award-winning Actress
 Jayne Mansfield - Actress
 Page McConnell – keyboardist for Phish
 Jay McGraw – son of Dr. Phil McGraw, "Dr. Phil"
 Debra Monk – Tony Award-winning actress
 Belita Moreno – actress; Benny on the George Lopez TV series
 N'dambi – Grammy-nominated recording artist
 Jeffrey Nordling – actor, 24, Desperate Housewives, Big Little Lies, Once and Again
 Sybil Robson Orr – film producer and former news anchor
 Candice Patton – actress, The Flash
 Khary Payton – actor, The Walking Dead
 Artemis Pebdani – actress, It's Always Sunny in Philadelphia
 Lynne Strow Piccolo - operatic soprano
 D.J. Pierce (a.k.a. Shangela Laquifa Wadley) – drag queen, reality television personality reality show participant (seasons 2 & 3 of RuPaul's Drag Race) and actor 
 Patricia Richardson – actress, Home Improvement, Strong Medicine, The West Wing
 Wolfgang Rübsam – German-American organist, pianist, composer, and pedagogue
 Saundra Santiago – actress, Miami Vice
 Wrenn Schmidt – actress
 Sarah Shahi – actress, Person of Interest and The L Word
 Joey Slotnick – actor, Boston Public, A League of Their Own
 David Lee Smith – actor, Fight Club and CSI: Miami
 Dan Smoot – journalist, author, radio, and television commentator; figure in the anti-communist movement
 Aaron Spelling – TV and film producer
 Rawson Stovall – video game producer
 Regina Taylor – playwright, director, Golden Globe-winning actress
 Carole Terry – organist, harpsichordist, and pedagogue
Frank Ticheli – musician, composer, and professor of music composition at University of Southern California
 Craig Timberlake – stage actor and opera singer
 Stephen Tobolowsky – actor
 Tsui Hark – film director
 Kellie Waymire – actor, notable for her appearances in the Star Trek franchise.
Alliene Brandon Webb, composer
 Irene Dubois – drag queen, reality television personality on RuPaul's Drag Race known for her alien-inspired drag.

Writing and journalism
 Deborah Coonts – romantic, mystery, and humor novelist; lawyer
 Robert M. Edsel – art history
 Craig Flournoy – Pulitzer Prize-winning journalist
 Beth Henley – Pulitzer Prize-winning playwright
 Monika Kørra – Norwegian author and athlete
Jack Myers – poet laureate of the state of Texas in 2003
 Matt Zoller Seitz - Editor at Large of RogerEbert.com, TV critic for New York Magazine and Vulture.com, and a Pulitzer Prize in criticism finalist
 Andy Sidaris – sports TV pioneer
 Clifton Taulbert – author and public speaker
 Marshall Terry – author, nicknamed Mr. SMU, founded the Creative Writing department, founded the university literary festival, co-winner of the Texas Institute of Letter's (TIL) top prize for best novel of 1968

Religious
 Sante Uberto Barbieri – a bishop of the Methodist Church in Latin America (earned bachelor's, master's and divinity degrees)
 Kirbyjon Caldwell – UM pastor and community leader in Houston, Texas, gave the benediction at George W. Bush's first inauguration
 John Wesley Hardt – a bishop of the United Methodist Church
 Robert E. Hayes Jr – a bishop of the United Methodist Church (M.Th. degree, 1972)
 Rev. Dr. Zan Wesley Holmes, Jr., pastor emeritus, St. Luke Community UMC, Dallas, TX
 Hiram "Doc" Jones – deputy chief of chaplains of the U.S. Air Force
 Scott J. Jones – a bishop of the United Methodist Church and former McCreless Associate Professor of Evangelism and director of the Center for the Advanced Study and Practice of Evangelism, Perkins School of Theology (earned M.Th. and PhD degrees)
 Neill F. Marriott – second counselor in the Young Women's General Presidency of the Church of Jesus Christ of Latter-day Saints (earned bachelor's degree in English literature and secondary education)
 William Clyde Martin – elected bishop to the Methodist Church, 1938
 Cecil Williams – pastor of Glide Memorial Church (United Methodist) in San Francisco, California

Non-profit
 Eleanor Smith Morrison - 11th National Commissioner  of the Boy Scouts of America

Athletics

Football

 Kenneth Acker – professional football player
 Jerry Ball – professional football player; three-time pro-bowler
 Chris Banjo – professional football player
 Lloyd Baxter – professional football player
 Kelvin Beachum – professional football player
 Cole Beasley – professional football player
 Ja'Gared Davis – professional football player
 Raymond Berry (B.B.A. 1955) – Pro Football Hall of Fame wide receiver
 Chris Bordano – professional football player
 Maury Bray – professional football player
 John Burleson – professional football player
 Michael Carter – professional football player and Olympic silver medalist
 Russell Carter – professional football player
 Putt Choate – professional football player
 Willard Dewveall – professional football player first "star" to go from NFL to AFL
 Eric Dickerson – Pro Football Hall of Fame running back
 Joe Ethridge – professional football player
 Bill Forester – professional football player; elected to Green Bay Packers Hall of Fame
 Eddie Garcia – professional football player
 Ben Gottschalk (born 1992), NFL football player
 Forrest Gregg – former NFL coach and Pro Football Hall of Fame tackle
 Glynn Gregory – professional football player
 Dale Hellestrae – professional football player; Played for 3 Dallas Cowboys Super Bowl teams
 Margus Hunt (class of 2013) – Cincinnati Bengals defensive end; former world junior champion in the discus and shot put, representing his homeland of Estonia
 Charlie Jackson – football player
 Craig James – football player; former commentator
 Don King – professional football player
 Josh Leribeus – professional football player
 Jerry LeVias – broke color barrier in the Southwest Conference; inducted into Texas Sports and College Football Hall of Fame
 Zach Line – professional football player
 Mike Livingston — a quarterback in the American Football League and National Football League for twelve seasons with the Kansas City Chiefs.
 Jerry Mays – professional football player
 Bryan McCann – professional football player for Dallas Cowboys
 Don Meredith – former Dallas Cowboys quarterback and Monday Night Football commentator
 Don Miller – professional football player
 Sterling Moore – professional football player
 Thomas Morstead – professional football player; kicker for the New Orleans Saints
 Jerry Norton – professional football player; five-time Pro Bowler
 Uzooma Okeke – professional football player
 Taylor Reed – professional football player
 Jerry Rhome – former Dallas Cowboys quarterback and College Football Hall of Fame inductee
 Mike Richardson – Professional football player
 John Roderick – professional football player
 Justin Rogers – All-conference defensive end; professional football player
 Kyle Rote – professional football player; four-time Pro Bowler
 Emmanuel Sanders – professional football player; Denver Broncos
 Ray Schoenke – professional football player and entrepreneur
 Courtland Sutton – professional football player
 Taylor Thompson – professional football player
 Ted Thompson - General manager of the Green Bay Packers from 2005 to 2017, American professional football player and executive in the National Football League (NFL).
 Doak Walker – Heisman Trophy winner and Pro Football Hall of Fame running back
 Val Joe Walker – professional football player
 Gene Wilson – professional football player
 Zach Wood – professional football player

Basketball

 Sterling Brown – professional basketball player
 Oscar Furlong – inducted into the FIBA Hall of Fame in 2007
 Rick Herrscher – professional basketball player
 Denny Holman – player in the ABA
 Feron Hunt – professional basketball player
Jalen Jones (born 1993) - basketball player for Hapoel Haifa in the Israeli Basketball Premier League
 Jon Koncak – professional basketball player
 Jim Krebs – professional basketball player
 Shake Milton – professional basketball player
Ben Moore (born 1995), basketball player in the Israeli Basketball Premier League
 Ike Ofoegbu (born 1984) - American-Nigerian Israeli Premier Basketball League player
 Semi Ojeleye – professional basketball player 
 Quinton Ross – professional basketball player
 Jeryl Sasser – professional basketball player

Baseball
 Rick Herrscher – New York Mets
 Jack Knott – pitcher, Chicago White Sox

Golf
 Bryson DeChambeau (B.S. 2016) – professional golfer, winner of a major championship, winner of the 2015 NCAA Individual Champion and 2015 U.S. Amateur Championship (one of only five golfers to win both titles in the same year)
 Colt Knost (B.B.A. 2007) – professional golfer; winner of the 2007 U.S. Amateur Championship and 2007 U.S. Amateur Public Links
 Kelly Kraft (B.B.A. 2011) – professional golfer
 Hank Kuehne (B.A. 1999) – professional golfer, winner of the 1998 U.S. Amateur Championship 
 Payne Stewart (B.B.A. 1979) – professional golfer, winner of three major championships (1989 PGA Championship, 1991 U.S. Open, 1999 U.S. Open), member of World Golf Hall of Fame
 DeWitt Weaver – golf consultant and former professional golfer

Soccer
 Jordan Cano – professional soccer player
 Kenny Cooper – professional soccer player, American international five-time
 Byron Foss – professional soccer player, Colorado Rapids MLS Football
 Kevin Friedland (born 1981) - professional soccer player
 Luchi Gonzalez – professional soccer player, Hermann Trophy winner
 Daniel Hernández – Professional soccer player
 Ramón Núñez – professional soccer player, Honduran international
 Chase Wileman – professional soccer player

Swimming
 Corrie Clark – Pan Am silver medalist swimmer
 Lars Frölander – Olympic gold medalist swimmer
 Jerry Heidenreich – Olympic gold medalist swimmer
 Steve Lundquist – Olympic gold medalist swimmer
 Martina Moravcová – Olympic silver medalist swimmer
 Ricardo Prado – Olympic silver medalist swimmer for Brazil
 Nina Rangelova – Bulgarian Olympic swimmer
 Richard Saeger – Olympic gold medalist swimmer

Track and Field
 Kajsa Bergqvist – Olympic high jump bronze medalist for Sweden
 Roald Bradstock – Olympian javelin thrower for Great Britain and an artist nicknamed "Olympic Picasso"
 Libor Charfreitag – Olympic hammer thrower for Slovakia
 Sten Ekberg – Olympic decathlon athlete for Sweden
 Florence Ezeh – hammer thrower for France and Togo
 Teri Steer – Olympic shot putter
 Jason Tunks – Olympic discus thrower for Canada

Other athletics
 Jack Adkisson – professional wrestler better known as "Fritz Von Erich"
 Jim Duggan – professional wrestler
 Nastia Liukin – world gymnastics champion; Olympic gold medalist
 Robert Richardson – Race car driver
 Isabella Tobias (2020) – American-born Olympic ice skater for Lithuania
 Mark Vines - former tennis player

Notable faculty members

Current faculty
 Ravi Batra – best-selling economist; awarded medal of the Italian Senate by Italian Prime Minister for predicting the downfall of Soviet communism
 Caroline Brettell, cultural anthropologist and fellow of the American Academy of Arts and Sciences
 John D. Buynak – developed compounds to help fight antibiotic-resistant bacteria
 Frederick R. Chang – former director of research at the National Security Agency
 Bill Dillon – associate dean, Cox School of Business
 Delores M. Etter – Fellow, National Academy of Engineering; former Assistant Secretary of the Navy for research, development, and acquisition
 Rick Halperin – chair, Amnesty International USA
 Eugene Herrin – co-developed a seismic system that detects underground nuclear detonations worldwide
 Choon Sae Lee – developed a new form of antenna
 Larry Shampine – his work was recognized by New Media Magazine as "one of the nine best digital projects on the planet"
 Brian Stump – co-developed a seismic system that detects underground nuclear detonations worldwide

Former faculty
 Robert Theodore Anderson – organist, composer, and pedagogue
 Lev Aronson – cellist, Holocaust survivor
Lewis Binford – Archaeologist and Fellow, National Academy of Sciences
José Antonio Bowen – former dean of the SMU Meadows School of the Arts, President of Goucher College, and jazz musician
 David J. Chard – Founding Dean of the SMU Simmons School of Education and Human Development, President of Wheelock College, Dean ad interim of the Boston University Wheelock College of Education & Human Development
 Jesse Lee Cuninggim – Methodist clergyman; served as head of the Department of Religious Education at SMU; received honorary degree from SMU
 Steven C. Currall – former provost of SMU, president of University of South Florida
 Hesham El-Rewini – former chair of the Computer Science and Engineering Department, within the Lyle School of Engineering, dean, University of North Dakota College of Engineering and Mines
 Craig Flournoy – Pulitzer Prize-winning journalist
 Elaine Heath – former McCreless Professor of Evangelism in the SMU Perkins School of Theology, former dean of the Duke Divinity School
 William Andrew Irwin – scholar of the Old Testament
 Michael K. McLendon – former Harold and Annette Simmons Centennial Chair in Higher Education Policy and Leadership at the SMU Simmons School of Education and Human Development, former provost ad interim, Baylor University, former dean of the Baylor School of Education
 Geoffrey Orsak – former dean of the SMU Lyle School of Engineering, former president of the University of Tulsa
 Laurence Perrine – author of Sound and Sense
 Ellen S. Pryor – former associate provost and the Homer R. Mitchell Endowed Professor of Law at the SMU Dedman College, founding associate dean for academic affairs at the University of North Texas at Dallas College of Law
 György Sándor – pianist and writer
 Laura J. Steinberg – former chair of the Civil and Environmental Engineering Department, within the Lyle School of Engineering, special assistant for strategy to vice chancellor for strategic initiatives and innovation, former dean of the Syracuse University College of Engineering and Computer Science
 Jeffrey W. Talley – former professor and chair of the Department of Civil and Environmental Engineering, the Bobby B. Lyle Professor of Leadership and Global Entrepreneurship and the Founding Director of the Hunter and Stephanie Hunt Institute for Engineering and Humanity, within the Lyle School of Engineering, Retired United States Army General and a Global Fellow for the IBM Center for the Business of Government, former president and CEO of Environmental Technology Solutions (ETS Partners), in Phoenix, Arizona Since 2017, he has also been a professor of Practice in the Price School of Public Policy at the University of Southern California.
 William Tsutsui – former dean of the SMU Dedman College, president of Hendrix College
Paul van Katwijk - former dean of the SMU School of Music
 P. Gregory Warden – former university distinguished professor emeritus of art history and associate dean for research and academic affairs at the SMU Meadows School of the Arts, president of Franklin College Switzerland
David J. Weber – Fellow, American Academy of Arts and Sciences
Fred Wendorf – archaeologist and Fellow, National Academy of Sciences
 Lori S. White – former SMU vice president for student affairs, vice chancellor for students at Washington University in St. Louis

Chairpersons of the board of trustees
The board of governors served as an executive committee of the 75-member board of trustees. Because of the group's size, most of the real governing was done by the 21-member board of governors. In the aftermath of the 1987 Football 'Death penalty' against SMU, the board of governors was eliminated and replaced with a smaller and more efficient board of trustees. The changes were also designed to increase the independence and authority of the university president. The new structure called for a board of trustees of 40 members and meeting four times a year instead of twice.

Chairpersons of the board of trustees

Chairpersons of the board of governors

Honorary degree recipients

 George H. W. Bush (Doctor of Humane Letters, 1992) – 41st president of the United States
 Gerald R. Ford (Doctor of Laws, 1975) – 38th president of the United States
 Juan Carlos I (Doctor of Arts, 2001) – King of Spain
 Jack Kilby (Doctor of Science) – Nobel Prize winner; inventor of the integrated circuit
 Bob Hope (Doctor of Humane Letters, 1967) – actor
 H. Ross Perot (Doctor of Humane Letters, 1991) – billionaire and former presidential candidate
 William McFerrin Stowe (Doctor of Laws, 1965) – bishop of the Methodist Church

Other SMU affiliates (non-alumni)
 U.S. Vice-president Dick Cheney was a diplomat-in-residence at SMU's John Goodwin Tower Center for Political Studies in March 1996. Later that year, Cheney was named to the SMU Board of Trustees, resigning in August 2000 when he became the Republican candidate for U.S. vice president.
 General Colin Powell in 1997 received the first Medal of Freedom Award given by SMU's John Goodwin Tower Center for Political Studies at Dedman College of Humanities and Sciences.
 Former Prime Minister of the United Kingdom Margaret Thatcher in 1999 received the second Medal of Freedom Award, presented to her by Colin Powell, the recipient of the first medal.
 Senator and candidate for the Republican nomination for US President John McCain received the Tower Center's Medal of Freedom Award in 2005.
 Former British prime minister Tony Blair received the Medal of Freedom Award in 2008.

SMU presidents

References

Southern Methodist University
Southern Methodist University people